The Japan national roller hockey team is the national team side of Japan at international roller hockey. Usually is part of FIRS Roller Hockey B World Cup and Roller Hockey Asia Cup.

Japan squad - 2010 FIRS Roller Hockey B World Cup 

Team Staff
 General Manager:Shun Okubo
 Mechanic:

Coaching Staff
 Head Coach: Kentaro Shichi
 Assistant:

Titles
Roller Hockey Asia Cup- 1989, 1995, 1999, 2011

References

External links
Official website of Japan Roller Skating Federation

National Roller Hockey Team
Roller hockey
National roller hockey (quad) teams